Pat O'Connor (October 9, 1928 – May 30, 1958) was an American racecar driver. He was killed in a 15-car pileup, after sustaining a fatal head injury after rolling his car and catching fire on the first lap of the 1958 Indianapolis 500.

Champ Car
O'Connor competed in 36 races in his champ car career. He took his first win in 1956 at Darlington Raceway. In 1957, he won the pole position for the Indianapolis 500 and he finished eighth. Later in the year, he won at Trenton Speedway.

He was on the cover of Sports Illustrated in May 1958 (one week before the race), adding to the legend of the Sports Illustrated Cover Jinx.

Death

For the 1958 Indianapolis 500, Dick Rathmann and Ed Elisian started the race on the front row, with Jimmy Reece on the outside of the front row. Elisian spun in turn 3 of the first lap and collided with  Rathmann's car, sending them both into the wall, and starting a 15-car pileup.

According to A. J. Foyt, O'Connor's car hit Reece's car, sailed fifty feet in the air, landed upside down, and burst into flames. Although O'Connor was incinerated in the accident, medical officials said that he was probably killed instantly from a fractured skull. In an interview after the race, winner Jimmy Bryan was quoted for saying "It was a nightmare. I lived with it for 200 laps."

Widely blamed for the accident, Elisian was suspended by USAC for the accident (reinstated a few days later), and was shunned by many in the racing community.

Following the accident, race officials announced that they would change the starting procedure, abandoning the single-file trip down pit lane that was used in 1957 and 1958. Also, for the 1959 Indy 500, metal roll bars welded to the frame behind the driver's head were mandated, and helmets were required to pass safety certification by Speedway medical officials.

Awards
He was inducted in the National Sprint Car Hall of Fame in 1995.

Legacy
Salem Speedway honored him along with Joe James with an annual title event. The 2020 event was part of the USAC Silvercrown series.

Complete AAA/USAC Championship Car results

Indianapolis 500 results

Complete Formula One World Championship results
(key)

World Championship career summary
The Indianapolis 500 was part of the FIA World Championship from 1950 through 1960. Drivers competing at Indy during those years were credited with World Championship points and participation. Pat O'Connor participated in 5 World Championship races. He started on the pole once but scored no World Championship points, as his best finish was eighth (twice).

See also
List of fatalities at Indianapolis

References

External links

1928 births
1958 deaths
Burials in Indiana
Indianapolis 500 drivers
Indianapolis 500 polesitters
National Sprint Car Hall of Fame inductees
People from North Vernon, Indiana
Racing drivers from Indiana
Racing drivers who died while racing
Sports deaths in Indiana
Deaths from head injury